Since 2002, the Charlotte Area Transit System (CATS) has incorporated public art in various capital improvement projects. Encouraged by the Federal Transit Administration policy circular 9400.1A, the Art in Transit program is to add visual quality with a profound impact on transit patrons and the community at large. CATS commits 1% of design and construction costs for the integration of art, which includes stations and surrounding areas, park and ride lots, transportation centers, maintenance facilities, and passenger amenities.

The following list are artists that have contributed to the Art in Transit program.

References

External links

CATS Rapid Transit Planning

Charlotte Area Transit System
Culture of Charlotte, North Carolina
Public art in the United States